Erythrococca is a plant genus of the family Euphorbiaceae, first described in 1849. It is native to Africa and the Arabian Peninsula.

Species

References

Acalypheae
Euphorbiaceae genera